Straight Lines is an EP by the Swedish band Junip. It was originally released on 7" vinyl in 2000 in a limited edition of 500 copies. The sleeve includes the message: "This is kakafoni 1, the beginning of a musical chaos with no end in sight. Please write to us". The album was recorded and mixed by Don Alsterberg and mastered by Don Alsterberg and Andreas Stridh.

Track listing
 "HC" – 4:12
 "Cut the Rope" – 5:08
 "Dilettante" – 3:54
 "Straight Lines" – 4:28

Personnel
Elias Araya – drums
Tobias Winterkorn – organ (Farfisa), effects, vocals
José González – vocals, guitar

External links
 Junip - Straight Lines (vinyl) at Discogs

2000 EPs
Junip albums